Year 1475 (MCDLXXV) was a common year starting on Sunday (link will display the full calendar) of the Julian calendar.

Events 
 January–December 
 January 10 – Battle of Vaslui (Moldavian–Ottoman Wars): Stephen III of Moldavia defeats the Ottoman Empire, which is led at this time by Mehmed the Conqueror of Constantinople.
 July 4 – Burgundian Wars: Edward IV of England lands in Calais, in support of the Duchy of Burgundy against France.
 August 29 – The Treaty of Picquigny ends the brief war between France and England.
 November 13 – Burgundian Wars – Battle on the Planta: Forces of the Old Swiss Confederacy are victorious against those of the Duchy of Savoy, near Sion, Switzerland.
 November 14 – The original Landshut Wedding takes place, between George, Duke of Bavaria, and Hedwig Jagiellon.
 December – The Principality of Theodoro falls to the Ottoman Empire, arguably taking with it the final remnant of the successor to the Roman Kingdom after nearly 2,228 years of Roman civilization since the legendary Founding of Rome in 753 BC.
Date unknown
 Recuyell of the Historyes of Troye is the first book to be printed in English, by William Caxton in Bruges (or 1473–74?).
 Rashi's commentary on the Torah is the first dated book to be printed in Hebrew, in Reggio di Calabria.
 Conrad of Megenberg's book, Buch der Natur, is published in Augsburg.
 In Wallachia, Radu cel Frumos loses the throne (for the last time), and is again replaced by Basarab Laiotă.

Births 

 January 9 – Crinitus, Italian humanist (d. 1507)
 January 29 – Giuliano Bugiardini, Italian painter (d. 1555)
 February 25 – Edward Plantagenet, 17th Earl of Warwick, last male member of the House of York (d. 1499)
 March 6 – Michelangelo Buonarroti, Italian sculptor (d. 1564)
 March 12 – Luca Gaurico, Italian astrologer (d. 1558)
 March 30 – Elisabeth of Culemborg, German noble (d. 1555)
 June 29 – Beatrice d'Este, duchess of Bari and Milan (d. 1497)
 September 6
 Artus Gouffier, Lord of Boissy, French nobleman and politician (d. 1519)
 Sebastiano Serlio, Italian Mannerist architect (d. 1554)
 September 8 – John Stokesley, English prelate (d. 1539)
 September 13 or April 1476 – Cesare Borgia, illegitimate son of Pope Alexander VI (approximate date; d. 1507)
 October 20 – Giovanni di Bernardo Rucellai, Italian Renaissance man of letters (d. 1525)
 November 2 – Anne of York, seventh child of King Edward IV of England and Elizabeth Woodville (d. 1511)
 November 28 – Anne Shelton, elder sister of Thomas Boleyn (d. 1556)
 December 11 – Pope Leo X (d. 1521)
 December 24 – Thomas Murner, German satirist (d. c. 1537)
 date unknown
 Valerius Anshelm, Swiss chronicler
 Vasco Núñez de Balboa, Spanish conquistador (approximate date; d. 1519)
 Gendun Gyatso, 2nd Dalai Lama (d. 1541)
 probable
 Thomas West, 9th Baron De La Warr (d. 1554)
 Margaret Drummond, mistress of James IV of Scotland (d. 1502)
 Pierre Gringoire, French poet and playwright (d. 1538)
 Filippo de Lurano, Italian composer (d. 1520)
 Gunilla Bese, Finnish noble and fiefholder (d. 1553)

Deaths 
 January – Radu cel Frumos, Voivoid of Wallachia (b. c. 1437)
 February 3 – John IV, Count of Nassau-Siegen (b. 1410)
 March – Simon of Trent, Italian saint, subject of a blood libel
 March 20 – Georges Chastellain, Burgundian chronicler and poet
 May 20 – Alice Chaucer, Duchess of Suffolk (born c.1404)
 June 13 – Joan of Portugal, Queen of Castile (b. 1439)
 September 6 – Adolph II of Nassau, Archbishop of Mainz (b. c. 1423)
 December 10 – Paolo Uccello, Italian painter (b. 1397)
 date unknown
 Theodorus Gaza, Greek scholar, one of the leaders of the revival of learning in the 15th century (b. c. 1400)
 Theodosius, Metropolitan of Moscow
 Masuccio Salernitano, Italian poet (b. 1410)

References